Cacia guttata is a species of beetle in the family Cerambycidae. It was described by Per Olof Christopher Aurivillius in 1927. It is known from Java and Moluccas.

Subspecies
 Cacia guttata aberrans Breuning, 1939
 Cacia guttata guttata (Aurivillius, 1927)

References

Cacia (beetle)
Beetles described in 1927